Elite Force may refer to:

Elite forces, highly trained military units
Star Trek: Voyager – Elite Force, first-person shooter released in 2000
Simon Shackleton, musician using the stage name "Elite Force"